Nirmal Singh Mohra is an Indian politician from the state of Haryana and is a member of Aam Aadmi Party led by Mr. Arvind Kejriwal.
Formerly, he was the Founder- President of Haryana Democratic Front, an independent political body founded by him in 2019. Before October 2019, he was a member of the Indian National Congress.

He has been elected as Member of the Legislative Assembly in Haryana Legislative Assembly for 4 terms (1982, 1991, 1996 and 2005) from Naggal constituency in his career and he has held the office of Minister for Animal Husbandry, Public Works Department and Revenue in Government of Haryana at different times. . He has been a member of the Haryana Legislative Assembly for the years 1982, 1991, 1996 and 2005 from Naggal constituency in Haryana as an INC candidate.

He was the first Haryana leader to raise the issue of discrimination in jobs, development and funding shown towards North Haryana by subsequent governments and leadership of the State.

To call out this discrimination, he organized two mega-rallies in the historic grounds of Kurukshetra, Haryana. First one was Hisaab Lagao Rally in the year 2002 on 25 June. This was followed by a second mega rally as Hisaab Chukao Rally in the year 2004 on 9 December, which saw massive participation from public and leadership alike from across Haryana.

He is fondly called Pradhan Ji, a name he earned as the President of Haryana Youth Congress for 7 successive years which is a record in itself. He has been Vice President of Haryana Pradesh Congress Committee too.

Occupational Details 

A farmer by lineage, Nirmal Singh Mohra has created Hazara Stud Farm, a thriving stud named after his father Master Hazara Singh. Hazara Stud Farm is amongst the leading stud Farms of the country where horses are bred for races across all centers of the country from Delhi, Mumbai to Bangalore and Hyderabad, Mysore in south.

He is married to Mrs. Naib Kaur and has four kids, two daughters and two sons. A family man to the core of his heart, he believes in the traditional values of a joint family, living and working together.

Entry into Politics 

Mr. Nirmal Singh's entry into politics was a natural progression from being a leader among his people and friends in his early years. It was due to his innate tendency to help the under trodden and fighting injustice abounding in society that he carried the mantle into politics too as an adult. Whether it was standing up to oppression of local strongmen in his village or rebuffing harassment of the weak, he was a person all knew they could turn to for help.

His Political journey started with Sh. Sanjay Gandhi in Indian Youth Congress. When Sh. Sanjay Gandhi's demonstration in Chandigarh was met with Lathi charge, Nirmal Singh threw himself over Sh. Sanjay Gandhi to protect him. From that day onwards, there was no looking back for his relationship with Congress. In 1974, he formally joined Indian Youth Congress.

Political career 

After Sanjay Gandhi’s demise, Nirmal Singh got the opportunity to work closely with Rajiv Gandhi. In 1976 he was appointed Block Youth Congress President and progressed to being appointed General Secretary of Pradesh Youth Congress, Haryana in 1980. He served as President State Youth Congress from August 1982-89 for 7 straight years, which is a record in itself.  Fifteen members of Youth Congress under his mentorship are now state level leaders across Haryana.
In 1982, he became the youngest person to be elected as Member of Legislative Assembly from Naggal Constituency, Haryana. In 1986, he became the youngest minister in Haryana Cabinet with the dual charge of President, State Youth Congress. Between 1987 and 1989, he was General Secretary Haryana Pradesh Youth Congress Committee with dual charge of Youth Congress President.
During 1983, he was a Member of India's first political Youth delegation to China after war. In 1985, he accompanied Late Sh. Rajiv Gandhi on his maiden visit to United States of America after being appointed as Prime Minister of India.
In 1986, at the age of 33, he became the youngest Minister to be a part of the Haryana Cabinet along with dual charge of Youth Congress President, Haryana. He has been elected Member of Legislative Assembly 4 times from Naggal constituency in his career and held the office of Minister of State for Animal Husbandry, Public Works Department and Revenue in Government of Haryana at different times.

He suffered a major setback in October 1994, when he was implicated in a murder investigation. He voluntarily resigned from his position as Minister of State for Revenue and was put behind bars for the next two and half years, denied bail, pending trial. He contested the next election in 1996 from behind bars as an independent candidate and won over all the other contestants forfeiting their deposits. He was honorably acquitted of all charges in February, 1997.
He re-joined Congress in 1999 in the presence of Sh. Ahmad Patel ji. He contested again from the same seat in 2000 and 2005 on Congress ticket.

Elections of 2009 Haryana Election saw his old constituency dissolved under delimitation and he was assigned the new constituency of Ambala Cantt. on the eve of election. He polled 43% of total votes but lost the election in the new area.
In the year 2014 Haryana Election, he contested as MLA candidate from Ambala Cantt. for the second time and lost in spite of getting 41% + votes.

In year 2019, he contested from Kurukshetra Parliamentary constituency as a Congress Member of Parliament candidate. Given the ticket and responsibility for the seat on the eve of election, he polled 3.48 Lakh votes but lost the election in the wave that gave BJP absolute majority in the country.

Later in year 2019 Haryana Election, he contested as an Independent candidate from Ambala City constituency after his daughter was denied a Party ticket from the adjoining Ambala Cantt. Constituency.
He garnered more than 56 thousand votes while coming second to Bhartiya Janta Party.

In November 2019, Nirmal Singh Mohra formed his own party Haryana Democratic Front with his loyal teammates and constituents.

Under the leadership of Nirmal Singh, in less than two years, Haryana Democratic Front formed it's State, district, Ward and Village unit's in various districts of North Haryana.

Haryana Democratic Front contested Municipal Corporation election 2020 in Ambala City and won 2 Corporator seats in the election while their Mayor came third following the winner and BJP.

In April 2022, Nirmal Singh Mohra along with his Daughter Chitra Sarwara (National General Secretary & Treasurer, Haryana Democratic Front), his Son Udayvir Singh Sonu (National General Secretary and Convenor Youth Front, Haryana Democratic Front) and team members of Haryana Democratic Front joined Aam Aadmi Party under the leadership of Sh. Arvind Kejriwal.

Vision for Politics 

He is a grass root leader who has built his career on a solid foundation of committed relationships with his team and people and an impeccable conduct.

A people's man, he believes that people should get the space to voice their thoughts and be enabled to exercise their rights whether its in organization or society.

He has a reputation for being extremely honest, approachable, very forthcoming with the help he can offer and straightforward when he cannot do so. A man committed to his word, he has stayed away from ever promising falsely or leading people on with false assurances.

In matters of state politics, he was the first man to put North Haryana on the political map of state by building and activating cadres in this region. He raised the matter of leaders being sent to this area from other parts of state to contest elections and there by killing any local leadership which would have a more organic growth in the area.

He truly believes in leadership by the people and for the people in its truest sense. His method of functioning relies on local teams and booth committees being major partners in all decisions concerning development for any area. He has always espoused 'Local Leadership' at every level of representation and governance.

Positions Held 

1974: Joined Youth Congress under the leadership of late Shri. Sanjay Gandhi. At that time Ambika Soni was the president of Indian Youth Congress.

1976: Appointed Block Youth Congress President under Ghulam Nabi Azad Indian Youth Congress President.

1978: Appointed District President Youth Congress, Ambala.

1980: Appointed General Secretary of Pradesh Youth Congress, Haryana.

1982: Elected as Member of Legislative Assembly for the 1st time from Naggal Constituency, Ambala, Haryana.

1982-89: Served as President State Youth Congress from August 1982 for seven years. During this time Sh. G.N. Azad, Tariq Anwar, Anand Sharma, Mukul Vasnik, Gurda Kumar, and Ramesh Chennthala were the presidents of the Indian Youth Congress.
(Note: worked Under Oscar Fernandez, Harish Rawat, and Bhola Pandey when they were general secretary in charge of Haryana youth congress.)

1983: Was a Member of India's first political youth delegation to China after war.
 
1985: Accompanied Late Shri. Rajiv Gandhi to U.S.A when he was the Prime minister of India.

1986: Joined Cabinet of Haryana CM Ch. Bansi Lal as State Minister with dual charge of Youth Congress President, Haryana.
                     
1987-89: Became General Secretary Haryana Pradesh Youth Congress Committee with dual charge of Youth Congress President.

1991: Elected as Member of Legislative Assembly for the 2nd time from Naggal Constituency, Ambala, Haryana.

1991-93: Joined Cabinet of Haryana CM Ch. Bhajan Lal as Cabinet Minister.

1996: Elected as Member of Legislative Assembly for 3rd time from Naggal Constituency, Ambala, Haryana.

2005: Elected as Member of Legislative Assembly for 4th time, Naggal Constituency, Ambala, Haryana.

2009: Lost Election from new constituency of Ambala Cantt post delimitation of old constituency of Naggal. Got 43% of total polled votes.

2012: President of District. Congress Committee (Rural).

2014: Stood Second in Ambala Vidhan Sabha with heavy majority of 42% of total votes polled.

2015: Vice President of Haryana Pradesh Congress Committee.

2017: President of District Congress Committee (Rural) from the last 15 years.

2018: Appointed as Special Invitee Member of All India Congress Committee.

2019: Left Congress and formed his own political party, Haryana Democratic Front. He was appointed as the Convenor and National President of Haryana Democratic Front.
2022: Joined as member of Aam Aadmi Party in the presence of Sh. Arvind Kejriwal, merging Haryana Democratic Front teams into Aam Aadmi Party.

As philanthropist 

A champion of poor and women empowerment, his house everyday sees help being extended to the poor girls' weddings, financial help for medical treatment and such to help people tide over a difficult spot.

He is foremost in supporting children who are active and show potential in sports. It usually translates into him providing kits to children, additional awards in tournaments and going out of his way to get grants for traditional sports such as Wrestling and Akhaaras Indian martial arts.

One of the activities he has actively pursued since his early days is to organize blood donation camps. First he organized blood donation camp in 1981 at Rukmani Devi Hall and collected 450 units which was record at that time. After that he again organized blood donation camp in 1985 at Village Pyarewala and collected 150 units. On the occasion of death anniversary of Sh. Rajiv Gandhi he organized blood donation camp at Congress Bhawan, Ambala Cantt in 2001. Recently on Kargil Vijay Diwas, he again organized a blood donation camp inviting all of Ambala to participate. Highlight of the event was that Military Hospital team itself came and collected units to be used for the armed forces besides a total of 201 units being donated that day.

References 

Living people
1953 births
Indian political party founders
Aam Aadmi Party politicians
Haryana MLAs 1982–1987
Haryana MLAs 1991–1996
Haryana MLAs 1996–2000
Haryana MLAs 2005–2009